Fleshwounds is the debut solo album from Skunk Anansie lead singer Skin. Not entirely satisfied with its initial release, Skin re-released it with new album artwork and a slightly different track listing. "As Long as That's True" was replaced with "Getting Away with It", a cover of the song by Electronic. The radio edit to "Faithfulness" was also added.

Three singles were released from this album; "Trashed", "Faithfulness" and the double A-side, "Lost" / "Getting Away with It".

Track listing
All tracks composed by Skin and Len Arran; except where indicated.

Original release
"Faithfulness" 
"Trashed" 
"Don't Let Me Down" 
"Listen to Yourself" 
"Lost" (Skin, Guy Chambers)
"The Trouble with Me" 
"I'll Try" (Skin, Craig Ross)
"You've Made Your Bed" 
"As Long as That's True" 
"Burnt Like You" 
"'Til Morning"

Re-release
"Faithfulness"
"Trashed"
"Don't Let Me Down"
"Listen to Yourself"
"Lost"
"The Trouble with Me"
"Getting Away with It" (Electronic cover)
"You've Made Your Bed"
"I'll Try"
"Burnt Like You"
"'Til Morning"
"Faithfulness" (Radio Mix)

Personnel
Skin - lead vocals, backing vocals
Ben Christophers - electric guitar, Wurlitzer organ, piano
Craig Ross - electric and acoustic guitar, Hammond organ
Milton McDonald - acoustic and electric guitar
Jacob Golden - acoustic and electric guitar, piano
Len Arran - acoustic guitar
Gail Ann Dorsey - electric bass, tambourine
Danny Thompson - double bass, acoustic bass
Richard "Cass" Lewis, Phil Spalding - electric bass
Phil Palmer - guitar
David Kosten - Wurlitzer organ, glockenspiel, vibraphone, Hammond organ, piano
Marius de Vries - keyboards, programming
Guy Chambers - keyboards, piano
Fay Lovsky - Theremin 
Gavin Bowes, Ian Thomas, Richard Jupp, Darrin Mooney, Gary O'Toole - drums
Mark Feltham - harmonica
Augusta Harris - cello
Drucilla Harris - violin
Livia Harris - recorder
Mike Figgis, Terry Edwards - trumpet
Mike Kearsey - trombone

Singles
Three singles were released from Fleshwounds.

Trashed
 "Trashed" (Skin & Len Arran)
 "On & On" (Skin & Len Arran)
 "Interview"

Faithfulness
 "Faithfulness" (Radio Mix) (Skin & Len Arran)
 "Faithfulness" (Scumfrog Mix) (Skin & Len Arran)

Lost/Getting Away with It
A video was shot and released before the single was withdrawn.

 "Lost"
 "Getting Away with It"

Charts

Weekly charts

Year-end charts

References

2003 debut albums
Skin (musician) albums
Albums produced by Marius de Vries
EMI Records albums